is a 2013 anime television series produced by Studio Deen and directed by Soubi Yamamoto, which is based on a series of Drama CDs released by Deen in 2011-2012. The series follows the activities of five male students who belong to their school's Glasses Club and the antics resulting from their shared passion for eyewear. The series premiered on Tokyo MX on October 6 and ended on December 22, 2013.

Synopsis
The plot focuses on Akira Souma, a glasses fanatic at the rural Himaraya Third Technical School. Akira's great love for glasses causes him to form the "Glasses Club" at his school and he somewhat forces his classmates and glasses wearers Takuma Hachimine, Yukiya Minabe, Mitsuki Kamatani, and Hayato Kimata to join. The series follows the activities of the Glasses Club and the antics resulting from their shared passion for eyewear.

Characters

Glasses Club

 Akira is a second year student and president of the Glasses Club. He starts the club in hopes to successfully make X-ray glasses. He is very passionate about glasses and those who wear them, and hates anyone who doesn't wear glasses (whom he calls "No-Glassers"). He wears square-shaped glasses.

 Mitsuki is a first year member. He idolizes Akira, but doesn't seem to get along with Hayato. He wears under-rim glasses.

 Takuma is in the class as Akira and Yukiya. He is cheerful, and really likes cream puffs. He also tends to sleep a lot. He wears Wellington glasses.

 Yukiya is Akira's childhood friend. He is soft spoken and always has his yPad with him. He wears half rim glasses.

 Hayato is another first year member. He is only a provisional member of the club because he wears fake glasses, and is made fun of for this. He wears oval square glasses.

Student Council

 William is the third year president of the Student Council. He is half Japanese and half British, he also suffers from chronic stomach pains. He wears round titanium framed glasses. He tends to speak his inner thoughts aloud.

 Lorenzo is the vice-president of the Student Council. He is half Japanese and half German. He is sadistic when it comes to Satou.

 Maximillian is a second-year member of the Student Council. He is half Japanese and half Italian. He loves the stage and tends to overreact to certain situations.

 Toru is a second-year member of the Student Council and the only one who is fully Japanese. He is nicknamed #3 by his classmates and hates Akira for giving him that nickname. He wears cat-eye glasses. He originally wished to join the glasses club, however his disdain for Akira calling him 3rd made him change his mind.

 Antonio is a first-year member of the Student Council. He is half-Japanese and half-Brazilian. He has a joyous personality, but he doesn't have good Japanese skills.

Faculty Staff

 Homeroom teacher of Class 2-E and Glasses Club advisor. He wears metal rimless glasses.

 Teaching assistant assigned to Class 2-E.

 Cafeteria Lady. She possesses an ability to know each student's favourite food through her half-rimmed spectacles and years of accumulated experience, and strives to prepare balanced food portion for students.

Others

 Hikaru is Akira's younger brother. In the last episode, it is revealed that he is blind.

 Satoru is Takuma's oldest brother who is a designer. He wears Wellington brow type glasses.

 Shinji is Takuma's older brother who is a model. He wears Wellington half-rim glasses.

 Owner of Cafe Tet-chan. He's an alumnus and a former teacher of Hima High.

 Yūto is Hayato's older brother. He wears the same fake glasses as Hayato, making him look like a bigger Hayato.

 Ikuto is Hayato's younger brother. He wears the same fake glasses as Hayato, making him look like a smaller Hayato.

Production
The series is produced by Studio Deen and directed by Soubi Yamamoto, along with script and series composer Deko Akao and original character designer Atsuko Nakajima. The twelve episode series premiered on Tokyo MX on October 6, 2013 and was later aired on BS11, SUN-TV, KBS and Fakui TV. The anime was picked up by Crunchyroll for streaming with English subtitles. The anime has been licensed by Sentai Filmworks in North America for digital and home video release in 2014.

The opening theme is "World's End" by MUCC and the ending theme is "Colorful World" by Tomohisa Sakou.

Episode list

References

External links
  
 

Anime with original screenplays
Studio Deen
Comedy anime and manga
Slice of life anime and manga
Sentai Filmworks
Toho Animation
Tokyo MX original programming